Qasr Al Muwaiji, or "Muwaiji Fort", is a fort in the central part of Al Ain in the Eastern Region of the Emirate of Abu Dhabi, the United Arab Emirates. It is noted as the birthplace of Sheikh Khalifa bin Zayed Al Nahyan, the former Ruler of Abu Dhabi and President of the United Arab Emirates (2004–2022), and where his father and predecessor, Zayed bin Sultan Al Nahyan, was based during his tenure as the Ruler's Representative of the Eastern Region of the Emirate. It was reportedly built in the early 20th century by Sheikh Khalifa bin Zayed bin Khalifa Al Nahyan, during the reign of his father.

Background 
The place, built on the western side of Al Ain, served as a place where officials met with the community to discuss issues and provide support.

Gallery

See also 
 2018 Abu Dhabi Tour
 List of cultural property of national significance in the United Arab Emirates
 Al Jahili Fort
 Mezyad Fort
 The Founder's Memorial
 Tawam (region)

References

External links 
 Qasr Al Muwaiji (YouTube)
 فيلم وثائقي - قصر المويجعي (in Arabic)

Forts and castles in Al Ain
Al-Muwaiji, Al-Ain